Catherine Rogers  may refer to:
 Katharine Rogers, actress
Cathy Rogers, TV executive

See also
Katie Rogers, character in Brookside